Smrečje v Črni is small settlement under the Črnivec Pass in the Municipality of Kamnik in the Upper Carniola region of Slovenia.

Name
The name of the settlement was changed from Smrečje to Smrečje v Črni in 1953.

References

External links

Smrečje v Črni on Geopedia

Populated places in the Municipality of Kamnik